Tempel 1 (official designation: 9P/Tempel) is a periodic Jupiter-family comet discovered by Wilhelm Tempel in 1867. It completes an orbit of the Sun every 5.5 years. Tempel 1 was the target of the Deep Impact space mission, which photographed a deliberate high-speed impact upon the comet in 2005. It was re-visited by the Stardust spacecraft on February 14, 2011 and came back to perihelion in August 2016.

Discovery and orbital history

Tempel 1 was discovered on April 3, 1867, by Wilhelm Tempel, who was working at Marseille. At the time of discovery, it approached perihelion once every 5.68 years (designations 9P/1867 G1 and 1867 II). It was subsequently observed in 1873 (9P/1873 G1, 1873 I, 1873a) and in 1879 (1879 III, 1879b).

Photographic attempts during 1898 and 1905 failed to recover the comet, and astronomers surmised that it had disintegrated, when in reality, its orbit had changed. Tempel 1's orbit occasionally brings it sufficiently close to Jupiter to be altered, with a consequent change in the comet's orbital period. This occurred in 1881 (closest approach to Jupiter of 0.55 AU), lengthening the orbital period to 6.5 years. Perihelion also changed, increasing by 50 million kilometres, rendering the comet far less visible from Earth.

Tempel 1 was rediscovered in 1967 (as 9P/1967 L1, 1966 VII), after British astronomer Brian G. Marsden performed precise calculations of the comet's orbit that took into account Jupiter's perturbations. Marsden found that further close approaches to Jupiter in 1941 (0.41 AU) and 1953 (0.77 AU) had decreased both the perihelion distance and the orbital period to values smaller than when the comet was initially discovered (5.84 and 5.55 years, respectively). These approaches moved Tempel 1 into its present libration around the 1:2 resonance with Jupiter. Despite an unfavorable 1967 return, Elizabeth Roemer of the Catalina Observatory took several photographs. Initial inspection revealed nothing, but in late 1968 she found a June 8, 1967 exposure (Tempel 1 had passed perihelion in January) that held the image of an 18th magnitude diffuse object very close to where Marsden had predicted the comet to be. At least two images are required for orbit computation, so the next return had to be awaited.

Roemer and L. M. Vaughn recovered the comet on January 11, 1972, from Steward Observatory (9P/1972 A1, 1972 V, 1972a). The comet became widely observed, reached a maximum brightness of magnitude 11 during May, and was last seen on July 10. Since that time the comet has been seen at every apparition, in 1978 (1978 II, 1977i), 1983 (1983 XI, 1982j), 1989 (1989 I, 1987e1), 1994 (1994 XIUX, 1993c), 2000 and 2005. Its orbital period is 5.515 years.

Physical characteristics

Tempel 1 is not a bright comet; its brightest apparent magnitude since discovery has been 11, far below naked-eye visibility. Its nucleus measures . Measurements taken by the Hubble Space Telescope in visible light and the Spitzer Space Telescope in infrared light suggest a low albedo of only 4%. A two-day rotation rate was also determined.

Exploration

Deep Impact space mission

On 4 July 2005 at 05:52 UTC (01:52 EDT), Tempel 1 was deliberately struck by one component of the NASA Deep Impact probe, one day before perihelion. The impact was photographed by the other component of the probe, which recorded a bright spray from the impact site. The impact was also observed by earthbound and space telescopes, which recorded a brightening of several magnitudes.

The crater that formed was not visible to Deep Impact due to the cloud of dust raised by the impact, but was estimated to be between 100 and 250 meters in diameter and 30 meters deep. The probe's spectrometer instrument detected dust particles finer than human hair, and discovered the presence of silicates, carbonates, smectite, metal sulfides (such as fool's gold), amorphous carbon and polycyclic aromatic hydrocarbons. Water ice was detected in the ejecta. The water ice came from 1 meter below the surface crust (the devolatized layer around the nucleus).

NEXT mission

In part because the crater formed during the Deep Impact collision could not be imaged during the initial flyby, on 3 July 2007, NASA approved the New Exploration of Tempel 1 (or NExT) mission. The low-cost mission utilized the already existing Stardust spacecraft, which had studied Comet Wild 2 in 2004. Stardust was placed into a new orbit so that it approached Tempel 1. This was the first time that a comet was visited twice.

On February 15, NASA scientists identified the crater formed by Deep Impact in images from Stardust. The crater is estimated to be  in diameter, and has a bright mound in the center likely created when material from the impact fell back into the crater. Energy of impactor According to NASA "The impactor delivers 19 Gigajoules (that's 4.8 tons of TNT) of kinetic energy to excavate the crater. This kinetic energy is generated by the combination of the mass of the impactor (370 kg; 816 lbs) and its velocity when it impacts (~10.2 km/s)". According to NASA, "The energy from the impact will excavate a crater approximately 100m wide and 28m deep".

The geometry of the flyby allowed investigators to obtain considerably more three-dimensional information about the nucleus from stereo pairs of images than during Deep Impact's encounter. Scientists were able to quickly spot locations where an elevated flow-like formation of icy material on the comet's surface receded due to sublimation between encounters.

Close approaches
Comets are in unstable orbits that evolve over time due to perturbations and outgassing.  Tempel 1 passed within 0.04 AU – or 5.9 million km (3.7 million mi) – of the dwarf planet Ceres on November 11, 2011.  Then, as a Jupiter-family comet, it will spend years interacting with the giant planet Jupiter, finally passing within 0.02 AU – or 3.0 million km (1.9 million mi) – of Mars on October 17, 2183.

Gallery

References

Further reading

External links

Space.com - Deep Impact
NASA - Deep Impact
NASA - Stardust-NExT*
Tempel 1 natural/contrast-enhanced 
Four views of Tempel 1

Periodic comets
0009
Comets visited by spacecraft
Comets in 2011
Comets in 2016
18670403